Profundiconus emersoni is a species of sea snail, a marine gastropod mollusk in the family Conidae, the cone snails and their allies.

Like all species within the genus Profundiconus, these cone snails are predatory and venomous. They are capable of "stinging" humans, therefore live ones should be handled carefully or not at all.

Description
The size of the shell attains 43 mm.

Distribution
This marine species occurs off Baja California, Mexico, and off the Galapagos Islands.

References

External links
 The Conus Biodiversity website
 

emersoni
Gastropods described in 1963